The Baraki Barak airstrike was a coalition airstrike that occurred on August 26, 2011, in Eastern Afghanistan. Six Afghan civilians from the same family were killed in the air strike in the Baraki Barak district of Logar province, Afghanistan. Four insurgents and three Afghan army members were also killed.

Logar provincial police chief Ghulam Sakhi Rogh Lewani said the operation had targeted a Taliban commander, Qari Hijran, who had a bounty on his head. The top official in the district, Mohammad Rahim Amin, claimed that the incident occurred when a local teacher provided shelter for the commander in his home.

References 

2011 in Afghanistan
Airstrikes during the War in Afghanistan (2001–2021)
Civilian casualties in the War in Afghanistan (2001–2021)
Logar Province
August 2011 events in Asia
Attacks in Afghanistan in 2011
2011 airstrikes